Wally Jones may refer to:

Wallace Jones (1926–2014), Olympic basketball player
Wally Jones, character in 1,000 Dollars a Minute

See also
Wali Jones (born 1942), American basketball player
Walter Jones (disambiguation)